KQIX-LP (96.5 FM) is a radio station licensed to serve Perryville, Arkansas.  The station is owned by St. Francis Chapel. It airs a Variety format.

The station was assigned the KQIX-LP call letters by the Federal Communications Commission on April 22, 2003.

References

External links
 
KQIX-LP service area per the FCC database

QIX-LP
QIX-LP
Perry County, Arkansas